Imantodes inornatus, the western tree snake, is a species of colubrid snake native to Central America. It can be found from Guatemala to Ecuador.

References

Imantodes
Reptiles described in 1896
Taxa named by George Albert Boulenger